Armed forces are the military of a nation.

Armed forces may also refer to:
 Armed Forces (album), an Elvis Costello album
 Armed Forces (Special Powers) Act, acts created by the Parliament of India
 Armed Forces (sports society) (Вооруженные Силы), one of the largest sporting organisations in the Soviet Union